Ámbar is a Chilean telenovela created by Daniella Castagno, that premiered on Mega on August 22, 2016 and ended on April 10, 2017. It stars Giulia Inostroza, Sigrid Alegría, Gonzalo Valenzuela and Álvaro Morales.

Plot 
Matilde is an apprehensive single mother who loves her daughter Ámbar above all else. With little time at her disposal, Matilde finds the dilemma of not being able to take and bring Ámbar from school. Therefore, she will have to trust the local school driver, Dany, a fun, simple, caring guy who cares for children with love and sometimes acts like a child. What begins as an appreciation on the part of Ámbar towards Dany will become admiration. She will see him as the ideal father she never had. Meanwhile, Matilde discovers that her new boss is Cristóbal Moller, the man who left her more than eight years ago without knowing she was pregnant. Although Cristóbal seeks to seduce her again, Matilde will be in search of something else. Dany has not only captivated Ámbar, Matilde also feels something nice for him.

Cast 
 Giulia Inostroza as Ámbar Moller 
 Gonzalo Valenzuela as Daniel "Dany" Marambio
 Sigrid Alegría as Matilde Errázuriz
 Álvaro Morales as Cristóbal Moller
 María José Bello as Carla Pino
 Coca Guazzini as María Inés "Nené" Riquelme
 Katyna Huberman as Ximena Segura
 Fernando Larraín as Gastón Fernández
 Solange Lackington as Mireya Zúñiga
 Claudio Arredondo as Rogelio Pino
 Tatiana Molina as Rosa Maldonado / Maribel Palacios
 Ignacio Achurra as Manuel Pino
 Magdalena Müller as Ana "Anita" Pino
 Li Fridman as Ignacia Bilbao
 Renato Jofré as Alex Santibáñez
 Giordano Rossi as Mateo Fernández Segura
 Manuela Opazo as Francisca Silva
 Emilia Echavarría as Javiera Fernández Segura
 Nicolás Risnik as Cristián Bilbao
 Joaquín Méndez as "Jota / Jote"
 Yamila Reyna as Eulalia "Luli" Suazo
 Patricia Velasco as Marta Santibáñez
 Catalina Olcay as Macarena
 Christian Zuñiga as Patricio Morales
 Carmen Zabala as Josefina Ponce

Ratings

References

External links 
 

2016 telenovelas
2016 Chilean television series debuts
2017 Chilean television series endings
Chilean telenovelas
Mega (Chilean TV channel) telenovelas
Spanish-language telenovelas